The 2005–06 Polish Basketball League was the 78th edition of the top basketball league of Poland.

Teams

League table

Ineligible for playoffs

Playoffs

FOR 3RD PLACE
Polpak Świecie 0 (-16)
60:68 (May 13, 2006 18:30 Grudziądz)
79:71 (May 17, 2006 18:00 Słupsk)
Energa Czarni Słupsk 2 (+16)

 Prokom Trefl Sopot
 Anwil Włocławek
 Energa Czarni Słupsk
 KS Polpak Świecie
 Era Śląsk Wrocław
 Stal Ostrów Wielkopolski
 BOT KS Turów Zgorzelec
 Polpharma Starogard Gdański
 Astoria Bydgoszcz
 Polonia SPEC Warszawa
 AZS Gaz Ziemny Koszalin
 DGP Azoty Unia Tarnów
 SKK Kotwica Kołobrzeg
 Noteć Inowrocław

External links
Polska Liga Koszykówki - Official Site 
Polish League at Eurobasket.com

Polish Basketball League seasons
Polish
Lea